Porto de Galinhas is a beach in the municipality of Ipojuca, Pernambuco, Brazil. Porto de Galinhas is a major tourist destination. The beach is famous for its bright-water beaches and the natural pools. The municipality of Ipojuca, where Porto de Galinhas lies, was established on November 12, 1895.

Origin of name
According to history the town was called  until 1850 when it became a place where people traded slaves to work in the plantations of sugar cane. To evade the control of the illegal transaction, slaves were transported together with guineafowl and passwords were created by traffickers (—"There are new chickens in the port"), hence the origin of the name.

Description
It has been voted "Best Brazilian Beach" for the eighth time in a row by the readers of Voyage & Tourism Brazilian magazine. According to this magazine, the main reasons given are the beauty of the natural pools (the closest to the coast in all of Brazil), the ecological trails, the hotel infrastructure and the proximity to a large city and the airport in Recife.

Gallery

References

External links

Porto de Galinhas basic information
 Destination Porto de Galinhas

Beaches of Brazil
Landforms of Pernambuco
Tourist attractions in Pernambuco